Viva la vie is a 1984 French film directed by Claude Lelouch.

Cast and roles
 Charlotte Rampling - Catherine Perrin
 Michel Piccoli - Michel Perrin
 Jean-Louis Trintignant - François Gaucher
 Évelyne Bouix - Sarah Gaucher
 Charles Aznavour - Edouard Takvorian
 Laurent Malet - Laurent Perrin
 Tanya Lopert - Julia
 Raymond Pellegrin - Barret
 Serge Riaboukine - Barret's Assistant
 Charles Gérard - Charles
 Anouk Aimée - Anouk
 Myriam Boyer - Pauline
 Philippe Laudenbach - Professor Sternberg
 Corinne Touzet - Catherine's Friend
 Martin Lamotte - TV Journalist
 Patrick Depeyrrat - Taxidriver
 Marilyne Even - A Witness
 Denis Lavant - Caviar delivery man

External links
 IMDb entry

1984 films
French comedy-drama films
Films directed by Claude Lelouch
1980s French films